The Odisha women's rugby union team represents Odisha in rugby union. The Odisha Rugby Football Association (ORFA), in association with India Rugby Football Union is the governing body for Odisha Women's Rugby Union Team.  Odisha's women's team is currently the best rugby football team in India as they have nearly won every competition they haves played.

Stadium

The Odisha Rugby Football Association (ORFA) has various bases across the state of Odisha; two of the main bases are Kalinga Stadium and KIIT Stadium in Bhubaneswar.

Kit
Odisha women's team have worn yellow and black for all of their Rugby Union games. At present, the shirt's body is of yellow color, the sleeves are white and the socks and shorts are both black.

Squad
Odisha's 23 Member Squad for the 2016 All India Women's 15s Rugby Tournament

Bhagyalaxmi Barik (Captain)
Hupi Majhi
Rajani Sabar
Manjulata Pradhan
Sanjukta Munda
Meerarani Henbram
Saraswati Hansdha
Basanti Pangi
Chandamuni Tudu
Laxmipriya Sahu
Jyosthna Rani Nayak
Poonam Singh
Kabita Kasturi Padhiari
Puja Senapati
Saraswati Hembram
Sasmita Maharana
Subha Laxmi Barik
Puspalata Pradhan
S. Yalna Priyadarshini
Subhapriya Barik
Lipika Biswal
Prangya
Ayushi Das

Administration
The following is the current organisational structure of Odisha Rugby Football Association (ORFA):

Honours
Senior National Women's Rugby 7s Championships
 Winners (2): 2013 (KISS), 2015, 2021
 Runners-up (1): 2014 (KISS)

All India & South Asia Rugby Tournament
 Winners (2): 2016, 2018
 Runners-up (1): 2017 

National Games of India
 Winners (1): 2015

Junior National U18 Girls Rugby 7s Championships
 Winners (1): 2014 (KISS)

SGFI School National U19 Girls Rugby 7s
 Winners (1): 2015-16
 Runners-up (1): 2014-15

SGFI School National U17 Girls Rugby 7s
 Winners (1): 2015

References

External links 
 The Official Website of Rugby India

Rugby union in India
Indian rugby union teams
Sport in Odisha